The 1937–38 Hovedserien season was the fourth season of ice hockey in Norway. Eight teams participated in the league, and Ski- og Fotballklubben Trygg won the championship.

First round

Group A

Group B

Final 
 Ski- og Fotballklubben Trygg - Grane 2:0

Relegation

First round
 Sportsklubben Strong - Stabæk Idrettsforening

Second round 
 B.14 - Stabæk Idrettsforening

External links 
 Norwegian Ice Hockey Federation

Nor
GET-ligaen seasons
1937–38 in Norwegian ice hockey